Sekolah Menengah Atas Negeri 4 Pontianak is one of the Public Schools in the Province of West Kalimantan, Indonesia.

Accreditation 
At the national level, SMA Negeri 4 Pontianak achieved "A" accreditation from Badan Akreditasi Nasional.

Extracurricular activities 
SMA Negeri 4 Pontianak has more than 22 extracurricular programs for its students. Each student must pick one (required for X grade) in addition to their studies. For example:
 Basketball
 Futsal
 Volley Ball
 English Study Club
 Modern/traditional dance
 Bridge

Notes

References

See also 
 Education in Indonesia
 List of schools in Indonesia

External links 
  Official Site of SMA Negeri 4 Pontianak

Schools in Indonesia
Education in West Kalimantan